Dean Smith (born 19 March 1971) is an English professional football manager and former player. He was most recently the manager of EFL Championship club Norwich City.

Starting his playing career as a defender with Walsall in 1989, over the course of five years he played 166 league and cup games. After signing for Hereford United in 1994, three years and 146 appearances later he moved on to Leyton Orient. In six years with Orient he made 309 appearances in all competitions, before earning a move to Sheffield Wednesday in 2003. After a season with Wednesday he moved on to Port Vale, retiring in January 2005. He scored 54 goals in 566 league games in a 16-year career in the Football League.

Returning to Leyton Orient, he worked as assistant manager until January 2009. In July 2009, he was appointed as Head of Youth at Walsall, before taking over as manager in January 2011. He took Walsall from the relegation zone to safety in his first four months in charge. He took Walsall to the 2015 final of the Football League Trophy, before leaving the club to manage Brentford in November 2015. Smith was appointed as Aston Villa manager in October 2018 and took the club from 15th in the Championship to the Premier League via the play-offs in the 2018–19 season, and then to the 2020 EFL Cup final. He was dismissed by Aston Villa in November 2021 and soon after joined Norwich City for a thirteen month spell in charge.

Playing career

Walsall
Smith started his playing career at Walsall, as the club suffered relegation from the Third Division in 1989–90 under John Barnwell's stewardship. They then struggled to adapt to life in the Fourth Division under new manager Kenny Hibbitt, finishing 16th in 1990–91 and 15th in 1991–92. The Saddlers qualified for the play-offs with a fifth-place finish in 1992–93, but were badly beaten by Crewe Alexandra at the semi-final stage. Walsall finished tenth in 1993–94, and Smith left the club, having played a total of 166 games for the Saddlers, scoring two goals.

Hereford United
In summer 1994, Smith was sold to Hereford United for £80,000, a club record fee for the "Bulls". They finished 16th in the Third Division in 1994–95 under John Layton. Smith was Graham Turner's captain at Edgar Street during the club's rise to the Third Division play-offs in 1995–96, where they were beaten by 4–2 Darlington at the semi-final stage, despite Smith opening the scoring just two minutes into the first leg.

Hereford were relegated from the English Football League after finishing in last place in 1996–97; they had been level on points with Brighton & Hove and with a superior goal difference, however goals scored was the decider and Brighton scored three more than Hereford over the course of the campaign. Smith scored 26 goals in 146 appearances in all competitions during his time at Edgar Street.

Leyton Orient
Smith signed with Tommy Taylor's Leyton Orient in August 1997, with a tribunal setting the fee at £42,500. He scored ten goals in 51 games in 1997–98; Orient would have finished one point outside the Third Division play-offs had they not been deducted three points. He captained Orient to the play-offs in 1998–99, and converted a penalty in the shoot-out victory over Rotherham United at the semi-final stage. However his team were beaten 1–0 by Scunthorpe United in the Wembley final. Over the course of the campaign he scored ten goals in 49 appearances.

Orient then struggled in 1999–2000, finishing in the bottom half of the table. Smith was again a key player, scoring six goals in 50 appearances. Following a fifth-place finish in 2000–01, he again captained the "O's" to the play-off final in 2001, this time at the Millennium Stadium. Despite twice taking the lead against Blackpool, they lost the match 4–2. Over the course of the season he scored five goals in 54 games.

He scored four goals in 51 games in 2001–02, but Paul Brush's team struggled and finished in mid-table, closer to the relegation zone than the play-offs, though they were 16 points above the drop. Smith continued to feature heavily in the 2002–03 campaign, though he left the club in mid-season. He had played 309 games for the club in all competitions, scoring 43 goals.

Sheffield Wednesday
He joined First Division side Sheffield Wednesday in February 2003, then managed by Chris Turner. The "Owls" were relegated at the end of the season, having finished in 22nd place, four points below Stoke City. He was appointed club captain in the summer, however Wednesday struggled in the Second Division and finished just three points above relegated Grimsby Town. Smith played 48 games in 2003–04, scoring one goal. The club then had a clear out of personnel, and Smith was one of 13 players to depart Hillsborough. He had scored one goal in 62 appearances for Wednesday.

Port Vale
In July 2004, he signed for Martin Foyle's Port Vale. He played 13 League One games and two cup games for the "Valiants" in 2004–05, before he ended his playing days in January 2005 when he left Vale Park to become youth team coach at his old club Leyton Orient.

Managerial career
After working as a youth coach at Leyton Orient from January 2005, Smith was promoted to the role of assistant manager toward the end of the 2004–05 season. He attained his UEFA Pro Licence in 2008, alongside classmates such as Roy Keane, Brendan Rodgers, and Ian McParland. After a poor run of form, Smith left Orient in January 2009, along with long serving manager Martin Ling.

Walsall
In July 2009, Smith returned to his first club, Walsall, in the role of Head of Youth.

Smith was appointed caretaker manager of Walsall on 4 January 2011, following the dismissal of Chris Hutchings. Seventeen days later he was announced as permanent manager of the club until the end of the season. Taking over managerial duties with his side nine points adrift at the foot of League One, Smith managed to steer Walsall out of the drop zone before the season's end. On 29 January, the "Saddlers" recorded their best league result since 1986 by beating Bristol Rovers 6–1, in what was Smith's first win in charge; the three points also took Walsall off the foot of the table, though they were still seven points short of safety. His team made up the difference over February, and a 1–0 win over promotion chasing Southampton on 1 March saw Walsall climb out of the relegation zone for the first time since October. They ended the season one point clear of Dagenham & Redbridge in the drop zone.

He let fourteen players go in summer 2011, including: Darren Byfield, Jonny Brain, Clayton McDonald, Paul Marshall, Matt Richards, Steve Jones, Aaron Lescott, David Bevan, Julian Gray, and Tom Williams. He then signed goalkeeper Dávid Gróf; defenders Mat Sadler and Lee Beevers; midfielders Kevan Hurst, Claude Gnakpa, Adam Chambers, and Anton Peterlin; and striker Ryan Jarvis. Also during the campaign he boosted his squad with loan signings Dave Martin, Mark Wilson, Andy Halliday, and Florent Cuvelier. His side lost just one of their first five league games, but then picked up just three points from their next seven games. They beat Preston North End on 15 October, but then picked up just four points from their next eight games. From 26 November, they were beaten just once in nine matches, but became the division's draw specialists as seven of these nine games finished level. They finished the campaign in 19th place, seven points clear of the relegation zone.

In summer 2012, he offered professional contracts to youth team players Mal Benning, Ben George, Aaron Williams and Kieron Morris. He continued to add promising young players by bringing in 21-year-old winger Ashley Hemmings, 19-year-old former loanee Florent Cuvelier, 19-year-old winger James Baxendale, 20-year-old defender Paul Downing, 19-year-old striker Connor Taylor, 23-year-old striker Febian Brandy, in addition to 32-year-old right-back Dean Holden. He also brought in full-back James Chambers, twin brother of Adam Chambers. He also brought in a number of players on loan, including: Karl Darlow (21), Sam Mantom (20), Aaron McCarey (20), and Craig Westcarr (27). Mantom was made into a permanent signing in January. Smith signed a new two-and-a-half-year contract in October, keeping him at the club until summer 2015. This came after the club announced a £10,000 profit on the previous campaign as Smith's 'Total Football' approach yielded a mid-table position for the young Walsall team, in addition to praise from pundits and fans. A poor run of results saw the team slip to just above the relegation zone in mid-December. Walsall recovered to win four of their five games in January, as Smith was named as Manager of the Month. They ended the season in ninth place, six points outside the play-offs.

During a fine start to the 2013–14 season, Smith, affectionately nicknamed "Ginger Mourinho" by the Walsall fans, took the club to an unlikely promotion push. He masterminded a win at Molineux against Black Country derby rivals, Wolverhampton Wanderers, and also ended winning streaks by table-toppers Leyton Orient and Brentford. The club could not sustain their promotion push however, and ended the campaign in 13th place. Smith released top-scorer Craig Westcarr at the end of the season, along with Troy Hewitt, Nicky Featherstone, James McQuilkin, and Shane Lewis.

He took Walsall to the 2015 final of the Football League Trophy, a 2–0 defeat to Bristol City, which was Walsall's first appearance at Wembley Stadium. At the end of the 2014–15 season he largely kept his squad together, the most high-profile player to be released being Ben Purkiss. He was given a Special Achievement Award by the League Managers Association (LMA).

Walsall started the 2015–16 season well, with Smith being named as League One Manager of the Month for August 2015 as the club ended the month at the top of the table. Walsall rejected an approach for Smith from Rotherham United in October, describing him as "fundamental to our future plans". Smith signed a new 12-month rolling contract on 16 October. He was named as Football League manager of the week after his side came from two goals down to beat Gillingham 3–2 on 24 October. However six weeks after signing his new contract he left Walsall for Brentford with the "Saddlers" fourth in the table; at the time of his departure he was the fourth longest serving manager in the Football League.

Brentford
Smith was appointed manager of Championship club Brentford on 30 November 2015. Brentford finished the 2015–16 season in ninth place, during which time Smith sold Toumani Diagouraga and James Tarkowski for a combined £3.6 million. In building for the 2016–17 season Smith signed 18 players, including Romaine Sawyers (free transfer) and Rico Henry (£1.5 million) from previous club Walsall. The "Bees" finished the season in tenth place, and Smith said he wanted to bring in more players in order to push for the play-offs the following season. He signed a new one-year contract extension in February 2018. Brentford finished the 2017–18 season in ninth-place and were "widely regarded as the Championship's entertainers" after Smith built an attractive passing style of play on a shoestring budget.

Aston Villa
On 10 October 2018, Smith was appointed manager of 15th-placed Championship club Aston Villa, with John Terry as his assistant coach. He was named as the EFL's manager of the week after overseeing a 3–0 win at Derby County on 10 November. He immediately managed to reinvigorate the Villa attack, and only a controversial injury-time equaliser from local rivals West Bromwich Albion at The Hawthorns kept them from a place in the top 6 by 7 December. Villa's form dipped dramatically in the three months after Jack Grealish was sidelined with a shin injury picked up in that match, but on 2 March, Smith gave Grealish the captaincy on his return to the first-team and the 23-year old inspired an important 4–0 victory over play-off rivals Derby County. Smith was given that month's Championship Manager of the Month award after achieving five wins in five games, including a victory over Second City derby rivals Birmingham City. On 22 April 2019, Smith led Aston Villa to break an 109 year old club record for longest winning run after defeating Millwall 1–0 at Villa Park to make it 10 successive victories in 10 matches. The record had previously been held at nine straight wins. On 11 May, Smith oversaw his 18th win with Aston Villa as they came from behind to beat West Brom 2–1 in the first leg of the Championship play-off semi-finals. Three days later, Villa came from behind at West Brom to win on penalties and secure a place in the play-off final. Villa went on to win promotion to the Premier League with a 2–1 victory over Derby County.

The club spent a net total of £144.5 million to bring in 12 players in the summer 2019 transfer window: Jota, Anwar El Ghazi, Wesley, Kortney Hause, Matt Targett, Tyrone Mings, Ezri Konsa, Björn Engels, Trézéguet, Douglas Luiz, Tom Heaton and Marvelous Nakamba. On 29 November 2019, midway through his first Premier League season with Aston Villa, Smith signed a contract extension lasting until 2023. In the EFL Cup, Villa advanced past Crewe Alexandra of League Two and four Premier League sides in Brighton & Hove Albion, Wolverhampton Wanderers, Liverpool and Leicester City to reach the final at Wembley Stadium; they lost the final 2–1 to Manchester City. In the league though, Villa were four points deep inside the relegation zone with four games left to play of the 2019–20 season, but pulled off what he called a "magnificent achievement" to clinch survival on the last day with a 1–1 draw at West Ham United. He elaborated by saying "I thought we used the pandemic really well. We've been solid defensively, we have looked strong and managed to stay in the Premier League."

Smith strengthened the squad in summer 2020 by signing Matty Cash (£14 million from Nottingham Forest), Ollie Watkins (£28 million from Brentford), Emiliano Martínez (£17 million from Arsenal), Bertrand Traoré (£17 million from Lyon) and Ross Barkley (season long-loan from Chelsea). On 4 October, in the third game of the 2020–21 season, Smith led Aston Villa to a 7–2 home win over Premier League champions Liverpool; this was the first time a team had scored seven goals past the top-flight champions in 67 years. A win against Leicester City then gave Villa their best start to a season since 1930. On 26 December, Smith oversaw his century of competitive games as manager of Aston Villa with a 3–0 victory over Crystal Palace despite his team being reduced to ten men for the majority of the game due to Tyrone Mings' first half dismissal. Smith was named as Premier League Manager of the Month for December as Villa conceded just one goal in their five league games. He made one signing in the January transfer window: midfielder Morgan Sanson from Marseille for £14 million. Aston Villa ended the campaign in 11th-place and Smith was keen to strengthen the squad further.

In preparation for the English record transfer of Jack Grealish to Manchester City, a deal worth £100 million, Smith brought in summer signings Emiliano Buendía, Leon Bailey and Danny Ings for a total fee of £83 million. The club also signed former player Ashley Young on a free transfer from Inter Milan, and for the third time signed Manchester United defender Axel Tuanzebe on loan. On 7 November 2021, Smith and Aston Villa parted company after a run of five straight defeats in the Premier League. Chief Executive Christian Purslow stated that the decision was made after Aston Villa had not continued to improve in the 2021–22 season as they had done in previous years.

Norwich City
On 15 November 2021, Smith signed a two-and-a-half year deal to become the new Norwich City head coach, replacing the outgoing Daniel Farke. He won his first game in charge, a 2–1 victory over Southampton. The game made him the first manager to take charge of successive Premier League matches against the same opponent. Norwich climbed out of the relegation zone on 21 January with a 3–0 win at Watford, having beaten Everton at Carrow Road six days previously. However the "Canaries" went on to win just one more Premier League game and were relegated in last place at the end of the 2021–22 season, though relegation was actually confirmed with four games left to play. On 27 December 2022, Smith was sacked as Norwich City head coach after a run of just three wins in thirteen Championship matches saw the club fall from first in October to fifth in the table and twelve points off the top two; sporting director Stuart Webber said the decision was taken in order to "give ourselves the best possible chance of achieving our objective of promotion to the Premier League this season", whilst pundits also criticised Smith for his style of play.

Personal life
Smith is married, and has two children - a son, Jamie, and daughter. Speaking in December 2019, he said that his family, coupled with his experiencing playing and managing in the lower leagues, have helped him to stay grounded and deal with the perceived pressure of managing a Premier League team. He is a keen chess player and was a West Midlands school chess champion as a child. His father, Ron, was an Aston Villa supporter, and a steward at Villa Park. Towards the end of his life, Ron Smith suffered from dementia and was not aware that his son had become Aston Villa manager. On the eve of the 2019 play-off final, Dean Smith visited his father and told him "The next time I see you, I'll be a Premier League manager." Ron Smith died on 27 May 2020 after contracting COVID-19.

Career statistics

Playing statistics
Source:

Managerial statistics

Managerial honours
Walsall
Football League Trophy runner-up: 2014–15

Aston Villa
EFL Championship play-offs: 2019
EFL Cup runner-up: 2019–20

Individual
League Managers Association Special Achievement Award: 2015
Football League One Manager of the Month: January 2013, August 2015
EFL Championship Manager of the Month: March 2019
Premier League Manager of the Month: December 2020

References

1971 births
Living people
Sportspeople from West Bromwich
Footballers from the West Midlands (county)
English footballers
Association football defenders
Walsall F.C. players
Hereford United F.C. players
Leyton Orient F.C. players
Sheffield Wednesday F.C. players
Port Vale F.C. players
English Football League players
English football managers
Walsall F.C. managers
Brentford F.C. managers
Aston Villa F.C. managers
Norwich City F.C. managers
English Football League managers
Premier League managers
Association football coaches
Leyton Orient F.C. non-playing staff
Walsall F.C. non-playing staff